Patience Opokua (born 17 June 1969) is a Ghanaian table tennis player. She competed in the women's singles event at the 1992 Summer Olympics.

References

1969 births
Living people
Ghanaian female table tennis players
Olympic table tennis players of Ghana
Table tennis players at the 1992 Summer Olympics
Place of birth missing (living people)